Catherine Elizabeth Benson, née Brewer (24 January 1822 – 27 February 1908) was one of the earliest women to earn a college bachelor's degree in the U.S.

Life
Benson was born on January 24, 1824, in Augusta, Georgia. She was daughter of Thomas Aspinwall Brewer (born on August 20, 1792, in Brookline, Massachusetts, died on September 26, 1874, in Macon, Georgia) and Mary Foster Brewer (born February 29, 1795, in Roxbury, Massachusetts, died on January 31, 1871, in Macon) who were married on October 3, 1820, in Roxbury. She had younger sister Adeline (born on October 5, 1825, in Lexington, Georgia, died on March 9, 1896, in Macon; she married firstly Napoleon Bonaparte Corbin on August 8, 1850, and secondly Robert B. Clayton on December 21, 1866, in Macon) and younger brother Edward Ebenezer (born on June 4, 1828, in Lexington, died  June 8, 1864, in Macon; he married Caroline Elizabeth Jones on July 17, 1858, in Fort Valley, Georgia). Her family moved from Massachusetts to Lexington in the 1820s. In 1838 they moved from Lexington to Macon.

Education
In nearby Gray, Georgia she enrolled in Clinton Female Seminary. The faculty and students, including Benson (Brewer) entered Georgia Female College (currently Wesleyan College) in 1839 when the seminary merged with the college. The college, chartered in 1836, began offering classes in 1839. She was the first woman to earn a degree from Wesleyan because her name came first alphabetically among the graduates of the class of 1840. She received diploma on  July 16, 1840. Her diploma said that "she had completed the regular course and bestowed on her the First Degree", which was commonly referred to the bachelor's degree. She is remembered each year at the annual meeting of the Wesleyan College Alumnae Association when graduating seniors are inducted into the association using the "Benson Charge", taken from a speech she made to the Class of 1888: Members of the graduating class, demands will be made upon you which were not made upon us.  Your training, if you are true to it, will amply qualify you to meet those demands.  No wiser blessing could I wish for you than that you may be true to every God-appointed work.

Though Benson has been listed as the first woman to receive a bachelor's degree in the U.S., women at Mississippi College had been earning such degrees since 1831.

Marriage and issue
She married Richard Aaron Benson (born on November 14, 1821, in Putnam County, Georgia, died on October 10, 1877 in Macon) on November 24, 1842, in Macon.  They had eight children:
 Catherine Colvard Benson (born on November 10, 1844, in Macon, died on January 31, 1885; she married Alex Melrose)
 Richard Edward Benson (born on October 20, 1846, in Macon, died ca. 1897; he married Emma Haskins on April 20, 1871, in Macon; they had son, Thomas A. Benson)
 Thomas Brewer Benson (born on January 22, 1849, in Macon, died on December 1880; he married Hattie E. Freeman on November 24, 1874, in Macon) - railroad conductor
 Eliza Sophie Benson (born on December 24, 1850, in Macon, died on September 7, 1912; she married J.M. Fargo)
 William Shepherd Benson - admiral who became the nation's first Chief of Naval Operations, an office created 11 May 1915.
 Frank Cook Benson (born on December 17, 1857, in Macon, died on October 57, 1943) - clerk
 Howard Burke Benson (born on May 4, 1862, died in September 1887) - clerk
 Gertrude Benson (born on November 12, 1864 in Macon, died on January 16, 1952; she married Henry C. Arnall)
Catherine Benson died at her home in Macon on February 27, 1908, at the age of 86 after several weeks of illness.

References 

Wesleyan College alumni
History of women's rights in the United States
1822 births
1908 deaths
People from Brookline, Massachusetts